Group 1 Rugby League was a rugby league competition held in the Northern Rivers region of New South Wales, Australia, run under the auspices of the Country Rugby League.  The group, however, still runs a junior rugby league competition.  When the Group 18-Gold Coast competition dissolved in 2005, the New South Wales sides joined together with Group 1 to form a divisional league, Northern Rivers Regional Rugby League (NRRRL).  Group 18 also still holds its own individual junior rugby league competition.

Seniors 

The Group 1 Senior Rugby League Premiership amalgamated with Group 18 Rugby League in 2005 to form the Northern Rivers Regional Rugby League, and was thus discontinued in its own right.

Juniors

Current Teams 
The following clubs are affiliated with Group 1 juniors, but run senior teams in the NRRRL competition: 
 Ballina Seagulls
 Casino RSM
 Clarence Coast Magpies (as Lower Clarence in NRRRL)
 Kyogle Turkeys
 Lismore Marist Brothers Rams

The following clubs are affiliated with Group 1 juniors, but run senior teams in the Group 2 Rugby League competition:
 Grafton Ghosts
 South Grafton Rebels

Former Teams 
The following clubs fielded junior teams in Group 1 competitions earlier in the 2010s
 Evans Head Bombers
 Northern United Dirrawongs
 Lennox Head Dolphins
 South Lismore Rabbits
 Upper Clarence

Notable Juniors

Ballina Seagulls
Frank Curran (1931-37 South Sydney Rabbitohs)
Mitchell Aubusson (2007-Sydney Roosters)
James Aubusson (2007-10 Melbourne Storm & Sydney Roosters)
James Roberts (2011- South Sydney Rabbitohs, Penrith Panthers, Gold Coast Titans & Brisbane Broncos)
Caleb Binge (2014 Gold Coast Titans)
Brian Kelly (2017- Manly Sea Eagles & Gold Coast Titans)
Nick Meaney (2018- Newcastle Knights & Canterbury Bulldogs)
Tyrone Roberts (2011- Newcastle Knights, Warrington Wolves & Gold Coast Titans)

Casino RSM
Matt King
Brian Smith
Tony Smith
Ben Kennedy
Albert Torrens
John Elford
Cody Walker (rugby league)

Clarence Coast Magpies (Lower Clarence Coast Magpies)
Luke Douglas
Tony Priddle
Nathan Brown
Daine Laurie (born 1999)
Daniel Wagon
Kevin Plummer

Kyogle Turkeys
Ken Nagas - Former Canberra Raiders (1992-02) player.
Nigel Roy - Former Illawarra Steelers (1993–94), North Sydney Bears (1995–99), Northern Eagles (2000) & London Broncos (2001-4) player.
Will Mathews - Former Gold Coast Titans (2008–11,2018–19) & St George Illawarra Dragons (2012–17) player.
Shannon Walker - Former Gold Coast Titans (2008–10) & Australia Rugby 7’s (20012-17) player.
Jone Macilai- Former Fiji Bati (2008–09) player.
David Grant - Former Canberra Raiders (1982–85) Balmain Tigers (1978–81), Eastern Suburbs Roosters (1977) & South Sydney Rabbitohs (1976) player.
Paul Doolan - Former St George Dragons (1990), Canterbury-Bankstown Bulldogs (1991–93) and Cronulla-Sutherland Sharks (1994–95) player

Lismore Marist Brothers Rams
Andrew King (rugby league)
Chris King (rugby league)
David Mead (rugby league)

First Grade Premierships 
1964-83 (Web Archive)

From The Vault on Wayback Machine

1964  ???

1965  ???

1966  ???

1967  Casino RSM
* Casino RSM also won the Clayton Cup.

1968  Casino RSM            32-10 South Lismore

1969 (Two competitions)  Ballina                7-3  Casino RSM & 
1969  Mallanganee           23-15 Baryulgil 

1970  Grafton               12-5  South Grafton

1971  Kyogle+               14-9  Lower Clarence

1972  ???

1973  Lower Clarence        27-13 Lismore Marist Brothers

1974  Western Suburbs       24-0  South Lismore-Woodburn

1975  South Grafton         17-8  South Lismore-Evans Head

1976  Casino RSM            22-7  South Grafton

1977  Grafton               16-14 South Grafton

1978  South Lismore-Evans Head                            18-14 Casino RSM

1979  Casino RSM            33-10 South Grafton

1980  Lismore Marist Brothers
24-8  South Grafton

1981  Lismore Marist Brothers                            20-2  Western Suburbs-Alstonville

1982  Ballina               14-4  Casino RSM

1983  Kyogle                14-12 Lower Clarence

1984-present (Grand Final results compiled from scores published in the Rugby League Week.)

References

External Links and Sources
 Rugby League Week at State Library of NSW Research and Collections

Rugby league competitions in New South Wales